; abbreviated as  or , is a national university in Saga, Saga Prefecture, Japan. The university has five faculties with around 7,000 students.

History
The history of Saga University is complicated. The oldest Saga teacher's school was demoted to a prefectural school by the law of teacher's schools.

 started in 1920. This high school is the origin of Saga University. Then,  and  started in 1943-1944. These schools were named "Saga University" in 1949.

  started in 1976. Saga University and Saga Medical School merged in 2003. And the National University was corporatised in 2004.

Campus locations
 Campus: Honjo, Saga City
 Campus: Nabeshima, Saga City

Faculties and graduate schools

Faculties
 Campus
Culture and Education
Economics
Science and Engineering
Agriculture
 Campus
Medicine

Graduate schools
 Campus
Education (Master's programme)
Economics (Master's programme)
Engineering (Master's and Doctorate programme)
Agriculture (Master's programme)
 Campus
Medicine (Master's and Doctorate programme)
Other
The United Graduate School of Agricultural Sciences, Kagoshima University (Doctorate programme)

Exchange program
Saga University offers an exchange program called SPACE (Saga University Program for Academic Exchange). SPACE is a one-year program, with its main purpose to increase the exchange student's Japanese skills. SPACE offers independent study that allows the exchange student to conduct a simple research project with a professor.

Ranking
From "World Universities' ranking on the Web: top 4,000 World Ranking." in July 2008, Saga University (Japan) was ranked 1298.

Alumni
 Muhammed Alamgir (geotechnical engineer and university vice-chancellor)
 Heiji Ogawa (Japanese governor)
 Hiroshi Tanaka (researcher)
 Jianbo Chen (researcher)
 Kozueko Morimoto (cartoonist)

References

External links
 Saga University website
 World Universities' ranking on the Web

Japanese national universities
Universities and colleges in Saga Prefecture